Beatrice Were (born circa 1966) is a Ugandan AIDS activist. She discovered that she was HIV-positive in 1991, a month after her husband died of AIDS.

Her work 
In 1993, Beatrice Were co-founded the non-governmental organization NACWOLA to unite Ugandan women living with HIV and to improve the quality of their lives. She has served as national coordinator of NACWOLA, and as the Executive Coordinator of the International Community of Women Living with HIV/AIDS, Uganda. She is currently National Coordinator for HIV/AIDS for ActionAid Uganda.

Activism 
One of Africa's highest profile AIDS activists, Beatrice Were has become known for her strongly worded criticism of U.S. global AIDS policy. She accuses the American government of distorting HIV prevention programs in Africa in favor of an ineffective abstinence-only approach, and thus increasing stigma and endangering lives. Her speech at the XVI International AIDS Conference in Toronto, in which she attacked the "ABC" approach to HIV prevention, won her a standing ovation.

Awards 
Were was awarded InterAction Humanitarian Award in 2003. She has also won the Human Rights Defender Award, the highest honor bestowed by Human Rights Watch.

External links 
Beatrice Were on the ActionAid website
Were in the World
Human Rights Watch Honors Ugandan AIDS Activist
Ugandans Report Mixed Message on AIDS Plan

HIV/AIDS activists
People with HIV/AIDS
Living people
1960s births
Ugandan activists
Ugandan women activists